State Route 155 (SR 155) is a  state highway in the central part of the U.S. state of Alabama. The southern terminus of the highway is at an intersection with U.S. Route 31 (US 31) just north of Jemison. The northern terminus of the highway is at an intersection with SR 119 in Montevallo.

Route description
From its beginning at Jemison, SR 155 travels in a northwestward direction as it leaves Chilton County. Crossing into Shelby County, the highway continues, traveling through rural areas of the county. Southeast of Montevallo, the highway has an intersection with SR 25 and turns west, forming a brief wrong-way concurrency.

SR 155 diverts from SR 25 at Montevallo and resumes its northward trajectory. The northern terminus of the highway is at an intersection with SR 119 near the entrance to the campus of the University of Montevallo.

Major intersections

See also

References

155
Transportation in Chilton County, Alabama
Transportation in Shelby County, Alabama
Montevallo, Alabama